The Tapajos fire-eye (Pyriglena similis) is an insectivorous bird in the antbird family Thamnophilidae.
It is found in Brazil.

Its natural habitats are subtropical or tropical dry forests, subtropical or tropical moist lowland forests, and subtropical or tropical moist montane forests.

References

 

Tapajos fire-eye
Tapajos fire-eye
Tapajos fire-eye